Oenothera linifolia is a species of flowering plant in the evening primrose family known by the common name threadleaf evening primrose. It is native to the southeastern United States.

References

External links

Night-blooming plants
linifolia
Flora of North America